The 1906–07 Missouri Tigers men's basketball team represented University of Missouri in the 1906–07 college basketball season. The team was led by first year head coach Dr. Isadore Anderson.  The captain of the team was H.A. Henley.  This was Missouri's first season of collegiate basketball. They finished with a 10–6 record.

Schedule and results

References

Missouri Tigers
Missouri Tigers men's basketball seasons
Tiger
Tiger